The Army and Air Force Motion Picture Service is a defunct organization that operated movie theaters on US Army and Air Force installations from 1920 until 1975. Before World War I, licensing rights to show motion pictures were the responsibility of individual installation commanders.

History
The Army Motion Picture Service (AMPS) was established on June 22, 1920, under the US War Department as a centralized entity to regulate admissions and film licenses among Army movie theaters, followed by the establishment of the Army Library Service in 1923. In 1941, the AMPS was transferred to the command of the Army Special Services, operating 94 theaters at that time.

Redesignation
In 1948, after the separation of Air Force as a distinct branch, the Army Motion Picture Service was redesignated the Army and Air Force Motion Picture Service.

Merger with AAFES
The AAFMPS was merged with the Army and Air Force Exchange Service on June 28, 1975, and its functions are now part of the U.S. Army Family and Morale, Welfare and Recreation; the G9 Division of the U.S. Army Installation Management Command (for the U.S. Army) and the Air Force Services Agency (for the U.S. Air Force).

References

United States Department of Defense agencies
Field operating agencies of the United States Air Force
United States Army organization